Sagenopteris is a genus of extinct seed ferns from the Triassic to late Early Cretaceous.<ref name="Elgorriaga2019">{{cite journal |last1=Elgorriaga |first1=A. |last2=Escapa |first2=I. H. |last3=Cúneo |first3=R. |year=2019 |title=Southern Hemisphere Caytoniales: vegetative and reproductive remains from the Lonco Trapial Formation (Lower Jurassic), Patagonia. |journal= Journal of Systematic Palaeontology |volume=17 |issue=17 |pages=1477–1495 |doi= 10.1080/14772019.2018.1535456|s2cid=92287804 }}</ref>

 Description Sagenopteris has palmately arranged leaves with anastomosing venation.

Different organs attributed to the same original plant can be reconstructed from co-occurrence at the same locality and from similarities in the stomatal apparatus and other anatomical peculiarities of fossilized cuticles. 
 Sagenopteris phillipsii may have been produced by the same plant as Caytonia nathorstii (ovulate organs) and Caytonanthus arberi (pollen organs).

 Species 
The following species have been described:

 Sagenopteris colpodes Sagenopteris elliptica Sagenopteris mclearni Sagenopteris nilssoniana Sagenopteris oregonensis Sagenopteris phillipsii Sagenopteris trapialensis Sagenopteris variabilis	
 Sagenopteris williamsii Distribution 
Fossils of Sagenopteris'' have been registered in:

Triassic
Argentina, China, Germany, Greenland, Italy, Japan, Kyrgyzstan, the Russian Federation, Sweden, Tajikistan, Ukraine, United States (Virginia, Virginia/North Carolina).

Jurassic (to Cretaceous)
Afghanistan, Antarctica, Argentina, Azerbaijan, Belarus, Canada (British Columbia, Yukon), China, Colombia (Valle Alto Formation, Caldas), Georgia, Germany, Greenland, India, Iran, Italy, Japan, Kazakhstan, Kyrgyzstan, Mexico, Peru, Poland, Romania, the Russian Federation, Tajikistan, Turkmenistan, Ukraine, the United Kingdom, United States (Alaska, Montana, Oregon/Idaho), and Uzbekistan.

Cretaceous
Belgium, Canada (British Columbia and Alberta), Greenland, the Russian Federation, and the United States (Montana).

References 

Pteridospermatophyta
Triassic first appearances
Triassic plants
Jurassic plants
Early Cretaceous plants
Early Cretaceous genus extinctions
Prehistoric plant genera
Fossil record of plants
Mesozoic Antarctica
Mesozoic life of Asia
Mesozoic life of Europe
Mesozoic life of North America
Prehistoric plants of North America
Jurassic Canada
Jurassic Mexico
Jurassic United States
Prehistoric plants of South America
Mesozoic life of South America
Triassic Argentina
Jurassic Argentina
Fossils of Argentina
Jurassic Colombia
Fossils of Colombia
Jurassic Peru
Fossils of Peru
Fossil taxa described in 1838